The Idol is a 1966 British drama film directed by Daniel Petrie and starring Jennifer Jones, Michael Parks, Jennifer Hilary and Guy Doleman. Set during the Swinging Sixties in London, the plot entails a rebellious student who disrupts the lives of all around him, leading to disastrous consequences.

Plot
Marco (Michael Parks), a young, arrogant art student, is friendly with Timothy (John Leyton), a medical student, and Sarah (Jennifer Hilary), Timothy's girl friend. Timothy is dominated by his wealthy and beautiful mother, Carol (Jennifer Jones), who is divorcing her husband. There is an Oedipal undercurrent between mother and son, and Timothy is not happy that Carol plans to marry again. Nevertheless, as Carol continues to control his life, Timothy wishes to be more independent.

Marco finds a studio apartment, and Timothy pays the first two months' rent, planning to move in with his friend and switch from medicine to art. An angry Carol prevents the move, and Sarah, who has fallen in love with Marco, moves in instead.

During a party at her weekend cottage, Carol becomes furious when she finds Marco and Sarah kissing in Timothy's room, and she orders Marco from the house. Later, Timothy is involved in a pub brawl, and Marco defends him and brings him home unconscious. Carol is appreciative, and warms to him. Later at a bar, Marco and Carol dance, and it is clear the repressed Carol is attracted to him. Timothy looks on, uneasily.

On New Year's Eve, Marco arrives at Carol's house to accompany Timothy to a party. But Timothy had already left, and Marco is left alone with Carol. He seduces her, then scorns her in retaliation for his earlier humiliation at the cottage. He leaves for the party which is on a boat, and arrives drunk accompanied by a streetwalker. He hints broadly to Sarah of his conquest of Carol, which Timothy overhears. Anguished, Timothy runs up on deck and Marco stumbles after him. Timothy violently thrusts him away, but a woozy Marco falls into the water and drowns, despite Timothy's efforts to save him. Questioned by the police, Timothy refuses to reveal the cause of the fight. Thus, without his admitting to the actual provocation, it is determined that Marco drowned at Timothy's instigation. Carol, who has arrived during the questioning, reaches out to Timothy as he is being led away by the police, but he coldly turns away.

Cast
Jennifer Jones as Carol
Michael Parks as Marco
John Leyton as Timothy
Jennifer Hilary as Sarah
Guy Doleman as Martin Livesey
Natasha Pyne as Rosalind
Jack Watson as Police Inspector
Jeremy Bulloch as Lewis
Gordon Gostelow as Simon
Priscilla Morgan as Rosie
Edna Morris as Mrs. Muller
Fanny Carby as Barmaid
Renee Houston as 1st Woman at Party
Caroline Blakiston as 2nd Woman at Party

Production
Carlo Ponti originally sent Jennifer Jones a script written by Ugo Liberatore suggesting she appear in it alongside her son Robert Walker Jr, playing mother and son. However Jones was reluctant to play the mother of her own son and declined. Joseph E. Levine acquired the script, had it rewritten by an English writer and signed Kim Stanley to star. Three days before filming was to begin Stanley fell ill; the producers offered the role to Jones who accepted.

Daniel Petrie had earlier directed the 1961 film A Raisin in the Sun. This Jennifer Jones film was rarely aired on TV. This was the first film Jones made after her husband David O. Selznick died the previous year. It was mostly shot in London.

Music
The soundtrack by John Dankworth includes "The Idol," "Empty Arms and Empty Heart," "The Party" and others. During the seduction scene, Marco plays a record of Vivaldi's "Winter" from The Four Seasons.

References

External links

1966 films
British drama films
1966 drama films
Films directed by Daniel Petrie
Embassy Pictures films
Films scored by John Dankworth
1960s English-language films
1960s British films